2Pacalypse Now is the debut studio album by American rapper 2Pac. It was released on November 12, 1991, by Interscope. 2Pacalypse Now is Tupac's commentary on contemporary social issues facing American society, such as racism, police brutality, poverty, black on black crime, and teenage pregnancy. It featured three singles: "Brenda's Got a Baby", "Trapped", and "If My Homie Calls".

2Pacalypse Now received positive reviews from critics and was certified Gold by the Recording Industry Association of America (RIAA) on April 19, 1995. In commemoration of its twenty-fifth anniversary, it was released on vinyl and cassette on November 11, 2016.

Controversy
The album generated significant controversy stemming from then-U.S. Vice President Dan Quayle's public criticism after Ronald Ray Howard murdered a Texas state trooper and his defense attorney claimed he was influenced by 2Pacalypse Now and its strong theme of police brutality. Quayle made the statement, "There's no reason for a record like this to be published. It has no place in our society."

Content 

2Pacalypse Now features productions by Digital Underground member Shock G and Stretch, as well as guest appearances from rappers Poppi and Pogo, R&B singer Dave Hollister and Stretch himself.

Lyricism 

2Pacalypse Now is a socially conscious hip hop album. It serves as Tupac's social commentary on issues that plague American society, including police brutality, gang violence, black on black crime, teenage pregnancy and racism. The album poetically addresses black urban concerns relevant to the present day. Although a relatively tame album compared to Shakur's later works, 2Pacalypse Now was known for its violent lyrics aimed at police officers and the government in the songs "Trapped", "I Don't Give a Fuck" and "Soulja's Story".

Critical reception 

2Pacalypse Now received generally positive reviews from critics. Although the album's political messages, lyrics and his storytelling were praised, Tupac Shakur's debut album was criticized for its production. In a retrospective review, RapReviews gave the album 4 stars out of 5 and said: "It's not an extraordinarily long album, but it is a dense and heavy listen that will take a lot out of you if you pay close attention to the persistent theme. The beats overall fail to make much of an impression, but perhaps that is as it should be, since nothing should be allowed to outshine this kind of lyrical performance. Tupac's vitriol is carried by his sincerity and charisma, both of which would emerge as key traits of the figure that blossomed in the years to come. Over the course of Tupac's career, the political got suffused by the personal and receded from the central position it occupied on his debut".

Commercial performance
2Pacalypse Now peaked at number 64 on the US Billboard 200 and number 13 on the US Top R&B/Hip-Hop Albums charts. On April 19, 1995, the album was certified gold by the Recording Industry Association of America (RIAA) for sales of over 500,000 copies in the United States. As of September 2011, the album has sold 923,455 copies in the United States.

Track listing
Credits are adapted from the album's liner notes.

Notes
Additional Vocals on "Trapped" performed by Dank, Playa-Playa and Wiz
Background Vocals on "Brenda's Got a Baby" performed by Dave Hollister
Background Vocals on "Trapped" performed by Shock G
Telephone Voices on "I Don't Give ..." spoken by Mickey Cooley, Rodney Cooley and Pogo
Background Vocals on "Violent" performed by 2Pac, Raw Fusion, and Descaro "Mac Mone" Moore
Background Vocals on "Something Wicked" performed by Pee-Wee
Keyboards on "Crooked ..." played by The Piano Man
Background Vocals on "Rebel of the Underground" performed by Shock G, Ray Luv, Yonni & Di-Di
Additional Vocals on "Part Time Mutha" performed by Angelique

Samples
Young Black Male
"Good Old Music" by Funkadelic
"Where Was You At" by War
"The Product" and "Dead Homiez" by Ice Cube
"I Got to Have It" by Ed O.G. & Da Bulldogs

Trapped
"The Spank" by James Brown
"Holy Ghost" by The Bar-Kays
"Her Silent Smile" by Tom Browne
"Save the World" by Southside Movement

Soulja's Story
"No Name Bar" by Isaac Hayes
"Sneakin' in the Back" by Tom Scott and the L.A. Express
"Ain't No Sunshine" by Bill Withers
"Synthetic Substitution" by Melvin Bliss
"Let the Bass Go" and "Mind Blowin by The D.O.C.

Violent
"Pirates Theme" by Home T, Cocoa Tea and Shabba Ranks
"City Under Siege" by Geto Boys
"Rebel Without a Pause" by Public Enemy
"Any Colour You Like" by Pink Floyd
"Halloween Theme Song" by John Carpenter

Words of Wisdom
"Chameleon" by Herbie Hancock

Something Wicked
"Welcome to the Terrordome" by Public Enemy
"It's Funky Enough" by The D.O.C.

Crooked Ass Nigga
"Crab Apple" by Idris Muhammad
"Kool is Back" by Funk, Inc.
"Straight Outta Compton", "Gangsta Gangsta" and "Fuck tha Police" by N.W.A

If My Homie Calls
"Let a Woman Be a Woman - Let a Man Be a Man" by Dyke & the Blazers
"Fat Mama" by Herbie Hancock
"I Don't Know What This World Is Coming To" by Wattsax
"I Don't Know What This World Is Coming To" by The Soul Children and Jesse Jackson
"Around the Way Girl" by LL Cool J
"Prelude" by N.W.A
"Theme from the Black Hole" by Parliament

The Lunatic
"One of Those Funky Thangs" by Parliament

Rebel of the Underground
"Impeach the President" by The Honey Drippers
"The Pinocchio Theory" by Bootsy Collins
"Theme from the Black Hole" by Parliament

Part Time Mutha
"Part-Time Lover" by Stevie Wonder feat. Luther Vandross
"Synthetic Substitution" by Melvin Bliss
"Part Time Suckers" by Boogie Down Productions

Charts

Weekly charts

Year-end charts

Certifications

References

Tupac Shakur albums
1991 debut albums
Interscope Records albums
Political hip hop albums